Pilot Mound Township is one of seventeen townships in Boone County, Iowa, USA.  As of the 2000 census, its population was 400.

History
Pilot Mound Township was organized in 1858. It wakes its name from a prominent mound in the central part of the township.

Geography
According to the USGS, it contains four cemeteries: Bethel Owen, Runyan, Schlicht and Shafer-Gear.

References

External links
 US-Counties.com
 City-Data.com

Townships in Boone County, Iowa
Townships in Iowa
1858 establishments in Iowa